Gelophaula palliata is a species of moth of the family Tortricidae. It is found in New Zealand.

The wingspan is 24–27 mm for males and about 29 mm for females. The forewings of the males are dark fuscous with pale-yellow scales, tinged with blue near the costa and dorsum. The hindwings are dark reddish fuscous. Females have pale-fuscous forewings, with light-yellow scales, which become bluish white towards the middle of the costa. Adults have been reported on wing from November to February.

The larvae have been recorded feeding on the rosettes of Celmisia prorepens.

References

Moths described in 1914
Archipini
Moths of New Zealand